Dreary House is a 1928 American silent drama film directed by Andrew L. Stone and starring Edith Roberts, Margaret Livingston and Ford Sterling.

Synopsis
On the day off her marriage a young woman inherits an old mansion house, currently occupied by a strange housekeeper. When a murder of one of her former lovers takes place there, she finds herself the prime suspect.

Cast
 Edith Roberts as Mary Wheeler 
 Margaret Livingston as Nancy Crowl 
 Ford Sterling as Paul 
 Noah Beery
 Earle Hughes
 Josef Swickard
 Edwin August

References

Bibliography
 Munden, Kenneth White. The American Film Institute Catalog of Motion Pictures Produced in the United States, Part 1. University of California Press, 1997.

External links

1928 films
1928 drama films
Silent American drama films
American silent feature films
1920s English-language films
American black-and-white films
Films directed by Andrew L. Stone
Films set in country houses
1920s American films